Greg Fairchild (born March 10, 1954) is a former American football guard, tackle and center. He played for the Cincinnati Bengals from 1976 to 1977 and for the Cleveland Browns in 1978.

References

1954 births
Living people
American football offensive guards
American football tackles
American football centers
Tulsa Golden Hurricane football players
Cincinnati Bengals players
Cleveland Browns players
Toronto Argonauts players
Michigan Panthers players
Memphis Showboats players